Timothy Edward Trimper (born September 28, 1958) is a Canadian former professional ice hockey forward who played 190 games in the National Hockey League for the Minnesota North Stars, Winnipeg Jets, and Chicago Black Hawks. As a youth, he played in the 1971 and 1972 Quebec International Pee-Wee Hockey Tournaments with a minor ice hockey team from Brampton.

Career statistics

Regular season and playoffs

References

External links
 

1958 births
Living people
Canadian ice hockey forwards
Chicago Blackhawks draft picks
Chicago Blackhawks players
Ice hockey people from Ontario
Minnesota North Stars players
New Brunswick Hawks players
Peterborough Petes (ice hockey) players
Salt Lake Golden Eagles (CHL) players
Sherbrooke Jets players
Sportspeople from Windsor, Ontario
Springfield Indians players
Winnipeg Jets (1979–1996) players